New Hopewell is an unincorporated community in Knox County, Tennessee, United States. The United States Geographic Names System classifies New Hopewell as a populated place.

References

Unincorporated communities in Knox County, Tennessee
Unincorporated communities in Tennessee